Shanghai Petrochemical, full name Sinopec Shanghai Petrochemical Company Limited, the subsidiary company of Sinopec, is one of the largest petrochemical enterprises in Mainland China. It is engaged in production of ethylene, fiber, resin and plastics. The company is registered in Shanghai.

Its headquarters are in Jinshan District, Shanghai.

There have been hopes that Sinopec, Shanghai Petrochemical's parent company, will process share reform and privatize Yizeng Chemical Fibre and Sinopec Shanghai Petrochemical, but the plan does not finalize until this moment.

References

External links

 Sinopec Shanghai Petrochemical Company Limited
 Sinopec Shanghai Petrochemical Company Limited 

Companies listed on the Hong Kong Stock Exchange
Companies listed on the Shanghai Stock Exchange
Companies formerly listed on the New York Stock Exchange
Oil companies of China
Petrochemical companies
Government-owned companies of China
Sinopec
Manufacturing companies based in Shanghai
H shares